The 2020 División Profesional season (officially the Copa de Primera TIGO-Visión Banco 2020 for sponsorship reasons) was the 86th season of the Paraguayan Primera División, the top-flight professional football league in Paraguay. The season began on 17 January and ended on 30 December. The fixtures for the season were announced on 16 December 2019. Olimpia were the defending champions after winning both tournaments of the 2019 season.

On 26 September, Cerro Porteño won the Torneo Apertura and clinched their thirty-third domestic championship with one match to spare following a 3–1 victory over River Plate, while the Torneo Clausura was won by Olimpia who clinched their forty-fifth domestic championship after defeating Guaraní on penalties in the final played on 30 December.

The tournament was suspended from 13 March to 21 July due to the COVID-19 pandemic.

Teams
Twelve teams competed in the season: the top ten teams in the relegation table of the previous season, and two teams promoted from the División Intermedia. The new teams were 2019 División Intermedia champions Guaireña and runners-up 12 de Octubre, with the former competing in the top tier for the first time ever and the latter returning after a five-year absence. Both teams replaced Deportivo Capiatá and Deportivo Santaní, who were relegated to the second tier after seven and two years, respectively.

Stadia and locations

Managerial changes

Effects of the COVID-19 pandemic
On 10 March, and following a 15-day suspension of all public or private mass gathering events ordered by the Paraguayan government as a response to the COVID-19 pandemic, the Paraguayan Football Association announced that every match of its official competitions, including the Primera División, would be played behind closed doors during that period of time. However, on 13 March the APF announced the suspension of the tournament, following advise from its Medical Directorate.

On 28 May 2020, the APF and the presidents of the 12 Primera División clubs reached an agreement to resume the competition on 17 July, with the ninth round of the Torneo Apertura. The plan to resume competition included socialization of health protocols to the Paraguayan government and application of COVID-19 tests before the start of individual training sessions on 10 June, with collective training to resume between 16 and 22 June. On the early morning of 17 July, within hours of the planned resumption of the competition, the APF announced the postponement of the matches involving 12 de Octubre, Guaraní and San Lorenzo, due to the confirmation of COVID-19 cases in those clubs, and after consultation with its Medical Directorate as well as the presidents of the league's 12 clubs, the governing body officially announced the postponement of the return of the competition to at least 22 July.

Following new tests in those three clubs which reported negative results, the competition was eventually confirmed to resume on 21 July, with the River Plate vs. Nacional and Cerro Porteño vs. Libertad matches.

Due to the four-month suspension of the season caused by the pandemic, the format for the Torneo Clausura had to be altered. Instead of the originally scheduled double round-robin, there was a first stage in which teams played each other once for a total of 11 games, five of which at home and another away, with the remaining match (on the sixth matchday) being played on neutral ground. The top eight teams after that single round-robin stage qualified for a play-off stage, with the quarter-finals, semi-finals and final to be played as single matches, and a penalty shootout deciding the winner in case of a draw.

Torneo Apertura
The Campeonato de Apertura, named "Dr. Emilio Insfrán Villalba", was the 121st official championship of the Primera División and the first championship of the 2020 season. It started on 17 January and concluded on 4 October. Prior to the COVID-19 pandemic, it was scheduled to conclude on 31 May.

Standings

Results

Top goalscorers

Source: Soccerway

Torneo Clausura
The Campeonato de Clausura, named "Profesor Cristóbal Maldonado", was the 122nd official championship of the Primera División and the second championship of the 2020 season. It started on 16 October and concluded on 30 December with the final.

First stage

Standings

Results

Play-offs

Quarter-finals

Semi-finals

Final

Top goalscorers
{| class="wikitable" border="1"
|-
! Rank
! Name
! Club
! Goals
|-
| align=center | 1
| Jorge Recalde
|Olimpia
| align=center | 9
|-
| align=center | 2
| Roque Santa Cruz
|Olimpia
| align=center | 7
|-
| align=center | 3
| Pablo Velázquez
|General Díaz
| align=center | 6
|-
| rowspan=2 align=center | 4
| Óscar Cardozo
|Libertad
| rowspan=2 align=center | 5
|-
| Pablo Zeballos
|12 de Octubre
|-
| rowspan=4 align=center | 6
| Cecilio Domínguez
|Guaraní
| rowspan=4 align=center | 4
|-
| Sebastián Ferreira
|Libertad
|-
| Jorge Ortega
|Sportivo Luqueño
|-
| Nildo Viera
|Sol de América
|}

Source: Soccerway

Aggregate table

Relegation
Relegation is determined at the end of the season by computing an average of the number of points earned per game over the past three seasons. The two teams with the lowest average will be relegated to the División Intermedia for the following season.

 Updated to matches played on 19 December 2020. Source: APF

References

External links
APF's official website 

Paraguay
Paraguayan Primera División seasons
Paraguay
P